Midila is a genus of moths of the family Crambidae.

Species
Midila agrippina Munroe, 1970
Midila albipes (Pagenstecher, 1892)
Midila bordonorum Munroe, 1972
Midila carneia Druce, 1902
Midila centralis Munroe, 1970
Midila crenulimargo Munroe, 1970
Midila daphne (Druce, 1895)
Midila discolor Munroe, 1970
Midila equatorialis Munroe, 1970
Midila fonteboalis Munroe, 1970
Midila guianensis Munroe, 1970
Midila lamia Munroe, 1970
Midila larua Munroe, 1970
Midila latipennis Munroe, 1970
Midila leonila Lopez, 1985
Midila martineziana Pastrana, 1960
Midila poppaea Munroe, 1970
Midila quadrifenestrata Herrich-Schäffer, [1858]
Midila rommeli Lopez, 1985
Midila soror Munroe, 1970
Midila strix Munroe, 1970
Midila sympatrica Munroe, 1970
Midila thessala Munroe, 1970
Midila trilineata Amsel, 1956

References

External links
Natural History Museum Lepidoptera genus database

Midilinae
Crambidae genera
Taxa named by Francis Walker (entomologist)